Oxalis magnifica is an Oxalis species found in Oaxaca, Mexico, described in 1919.

References

External links

magnifica
Plants described in 1919